Temescal Canyon (Temescal, Spanish for "sweat lodge") is the canyon below the mouth of Temescal Valley, carrying Temescal Creek, through the hills in and to the east of El Cerrito, Riverside County, California.

Head of canyon 

Mouth of canyon

References

Landforms of Riverside County, California
Canyons and gorges of California